Clifton is a village in the English county of Lancashire and in the district of Fylde. The village is part of the civil parish of Newton-with-Clifton.

The village is also home to the church of St John the Evangelist, also known as Lund parish church, which is situated on Church Lane, and the Grade II listed Clifton Hall.

Amenities 
The village once had a Post Office and still has convenience store and a number of small businesses, including
a garage. Near the village is a branch of Dobbies Garden Centre and a caravan and motor-home sales centre.

In December 2014 radio station CliftonFM made its inaugural broadcast. Highlights included Stereo Mathematics, Church Hall v Cathedral and an organ sing along. The station no longer broadcasts.

Transport links
The nearest rail station is Salwick railway station, but this has only a limited service. A more comprehensive service is available from Kirkham and Wesham railway station provided by Northern.

The Blackpool to Preston No 61 bus service passes through Clifton.

Nearby towns and villages
 Freckleton
 Kirkham
 Newton-with-Scales
 Preston
 Salwick
 Wrea Green

Gallery

See also
Listed buildings in Newton-with-Clifton

References

Villages in Lancashire
Geography of the Borough of Fylde